Charles-Louis Antiboul (20 May 1752, Saint-Tropez – 31 October 1793) was a French Girondist politician. He was a member of the National Convention from 1792 to 1793. On 7 September 1793 he was ordered to be arrested. On 30 October 1793 he was sentenced to death by the Revolutionary Tribunal and executed the following day.

References

1752 births
1793 deaths
People from Saint-Tropez
Politicians from Provence-Alpes-Côte d'Azur
Girondins
Deputies to the French National Convention
French people executed by guillotine during the French Revolution